William Davies (dates of birth and death unknown) was an English cricketer. Davies' batting style is unknown.

Davies made a single first-class appearance for a West of England cricket team against the Marylebone Cricket Club at Lord's in 1844. In a match which the Marylebone Cricket Club won by two wickets, Davies was dismissed for a duck by William Lillywhite in the West's first-innings, while in their second-innings he was dismissed for a single run by Jemmy Dean.

References

External links
William Davies at ESPNcricinfo
William Davies at CricketArchive

English cricketers
West of England cricketers
Year of birth unknown
Year of death unknown